Daoud Younis Abdallah Iraqi (born 13 September 1999) is a Palestinian professional footballer who plays as a forward for Berliner AK 07.

Career statistics

Club

Notes

International

References

1999 births
Living people
Palestinian footballers
Palestinian expatriate footballers
Association football forwards
Hertha Zehlendorf players
Tennis Borussia Berlin players
Berliner AK 07 players
Expatriate footballers in Germany
Palestinian expatriate sportspeople in Germany
Palestine international footballers
Palestine youth international footballers